Pour Moi may refer to:

 Pour Moi (horse), an Irish-French racehorse
 Pour Moi Ltd, a British lingerie and swimwear brand